Setiptiline (brand name Tecipul), also known as teciptiline, is a tetracyclic antidepressant (TeCA) that acts as a noradrenergic and specific serotonergic antidepressant (NaSSA). It was launched in 1989 for the treatment of depression in Japan by Mochida.

Pharmacology

Pharmacodynamics

Setiptiline acts as a norepinephrine reuptake inhibitor, α2-adrenergic receptor antagonist, and serotonin receptor antagonist, likely at the 5-HT2 subtypes, as well as an H1 receptor inverse agonist/antihistamine.

Chemistry
Setiptiline has a tetracyclic structure and is a close analogue of mianserin and mirtazapine, with setiptiline being delta(13b,4a),4a-carba-mianserin, and mirtazapine being 6-azamianserin.

See also
 Aptazapine
 Mianserin
 Mirtazapine

References

Alpha-2 blockers
H1 receptor antagonists
Noradrenergic and specific serotonergic antidepressants
Piperidines
Serotonin receptor antagonists
Tetracyclic antidepressants